Becky Sharp, from Vanity Fair

Becky Sharp (film) a 1935 film

Becky Sharp, unrelated character from Kitchen Confidential (TV series)